Siege Dome is a small, ice-covered prominence standing to the south of the head of Hood Glacier, close southeast of Mount Patrick in the Commonwealth Range. Named by the New Zealand Alpine Club Antarctic Expedition (1959–60) because while attempting to establish a survey station here, they met with an eight-day katabatic blizzard.

References
 

Ice caps of Antarctica
Bodies of ice of the Ross Dependency
Dufek Coast